Josef Anton Hafner (15 August 1709, Türkheim - 1756, Türkheim) was a German decorative painter.

Life and work 
He was the son of a tailor, and probably studied in Augsburg with Johann Georg Bergmüller, who was also from Türkheim. His earliest attributed work is an altarpiece in Lindenberg im Allgäu, depicting Saint George.

Shortly after, he created a flag for the All Souls' Brotherhood in Türkheim, that depicted purgatory on one side, and was used for funerals until the early 20th century. In 1734, he created more flags for the Brotherhood.

This resulted in numerous orders for similar works. He was apparently involved in painting several church ceilings in the area around Lake Constance, c.1745. He may have also worked for private individuals, but this has not been firmly established.

He died of consumption sometime in 1756.

Sources 
  "Hafner, Josef Anton". In: Ulrich Thieme, Fred. C. Willis (Eds.): Allgemeines Lexikon der Bildenden Künstler von der Antike bis zur Gegenwart, Vol.15: Gresse–Hanselmann. E. A. Seemann, Leipzig 1922, pg. 449 (Online) 
 Andrea Schaller: "Hafner, Josef Anton", In: Allgemeines Künstlerlexikon, Vol.67, de Gruyter, Berlin 2010, pg. 369

External links 

1709 births
1756 deaths
People from Unterallgäu
18th-century German painters
18th-century German male artists
German male painters